Andreas Langl (born 15 October 1966) is an Austrian former cyclist. He competed in the individual road race at the 1992 Summer Olympics.

References

External links
 

1966 births
Living people
Austrian male cyclists
Olympic cyclists of Austria
Cyclists at the 1992 Summer Olympics
People from Braunau am Inn
Sportspeople from Upper Austria
20th-century Austrian people